The name Melanippe is the feminine counterpart of Melanippus.

In Greek mythology, the name Melanippe referred to several different people:
 Melanippe, daughter of the Centaur Chiron. Also known as Hippe or Euippe. She bore a daughter to Aeolus, Melanippe or Arne (see below). She escaped to Mount Pelion so that her father would not find out that she was pregnant, but, being searched for, she prayed to Artemis asking for assistance, and the goddess transformed her into a mare. Other accounts state that the transformation was a punishment for her having scorned Artemis, or for having divulged the secrets of gods. She was later placed among the stars.
Melanippe, daughter of Aeolus and the precedent Melanippe (or else daughter of Hippotes or of Desmontes).
 Melanippe, a Aetolian princess as the daughter of King Oeneus of Calydon and Althaea, daughter of King Thestius of Pleuron. As one of the Meleagrids, she was turned into a guinea fowl by Artemis after the death of her brother, Meleager.
 Melanippe, an Amazon, sister of Hippolyta, Penthesilea and Antiope, daughter of Ares. Heracles captured her and demanded Hippolyte's girdle in exchange for her freedom. Hippolyte complied and Heracles let her go. Some say that it was Melanippe whom Theseus abducted and married. Yet others relate that she was killed by Telamon.
 Melanippe, wife of Hippotes, son of Mimas, himself son of Aeolus, and the mother of another Aeolus.
 Melanippe, a nymph who married Itonus, son of Amphictyon.
Melanippe, possible wife of King Chalcodon of Euboea and mother of Elephenor.
Melanippe, an emendation for "Medippe" (name of one of the sacrificial victims of Minotaur) in Servius' commentaries on Aeneid.

Notes

References
Apollodorus, The Library with an English Translation by Sir James George Frazer, F.B.A., F.R.S. in 2 Volumes, Cambridge, MA, Harvard University Press; London, William Heinemann Ltd. 1921. ISBN 0-674-99135-4. Online version at the Perseus Digital Library. Greek text available from the same website.
Antoninus Liberalis, The Metamorphoses of Antoninus Liberalis translated by Francis Celoria (Routledge 1992). Online version at the Topos Text Project.
Diodorus Siculus, The Library of History translated by Charles Henry Oldfather. Twelve volumes. Loeb Classical Library. Cambridge, Massachusetts: Harvard University Press; London: William Heinemann, Ltd. 1989. Vol. 3. Books 4.59–8. Online version at Bill Thayer's Web Site
Diodorus Siculus, Bibliotheca Historica. Vol 1-2. Immanel Bekker. Ludwig Dindorf. Friedrich Vogel. in aedibus B. G. Teubneri. Leipzig. 1888-1890. Greek text available at the Perseus Digital Library.
Gaius Julius Hyginus, Astronomica from The Myths of Hyginus translated and edited by Mary Grant. University of Kansas Publications in Humanistic Studies. Online version at the Topos Text Project.
Pausanias, Description of Greece with an English Translation by W.H.S. Jones, Litt.D., and H.A. Ormerod, M.A., in 4 Volumes. Cambridge, MA, Harvard University Press; London, William Heinemann Ltd. 1918. Online version at the Perseus Digital Library
Pausanias, Graeciae Descriptio. 3 vols. Leipzig, Teubner. 1903.  Greek text available at the Perseus Digital Library.
Smith, William; Dictionary of Greek and Roman Biography and Mythology, London (1873).

Children of Ares
Amazons (Greek mythology)
Nymphs
Princesses in Greek mythology
Metamorphoses into animals in Greek mythology
Aetolian characters in Greek mythology
Euboean characters in Greek mythology